Alejandro Gutiérrez del Barrio (February 2, 1895 – September 15, 1954) was a Spanish born musician and score composer who worked in the Cinema of Argentina between 1936 and his death in 1954. A professional score composer hired by the film industry he composed the soundtracks to some 75 films and also a number of his earlier compositions were used in films some 6 years after his death. He composed the music to films such as Almafuerte in 1949.

Selected filmography
 Santos Vega (1936)
 Our Land of Peace (1939)
 A Thief Has Arrived (1940)
 Mother Gloria (1941)
 When the Heart Sings (1941)
 The House of the Millions (1942)
 Story of a Poor Young Man (1942)
 The Prodigal Woman (1945)
 María Rosa (1946)
 The Sin of Julia (1946)
 The Three Rats (1946)
 Musical Romance (1947)
 Lucrezia Borgia (1947)
 Juan Moreira (1948)
 My Poor Beloved Mother (1948)
 The Unwanted (1951)

External links
 

Argentine film score composers
Spanish film score composers
Male film score composers
Spanish composers
Spanish male composers
1895 births
1964 deaths
Argentine people of Spanish descent
20th-century composers
20th-century Spanish musicians
20th-century Spanish male musicians